A tube man, also known as a skydancer, air dancer, inflatable man and originally called the Tall Boy, is an inflatable stick figure comprising sections of fabric tubing attached to a fan. As the fan blows air through it, the tubing moves in a dynamic dancing or flailing motion. Tube men are typically used to advertise retail business premises to passing motorists.

Peter Minshall, an artist from Trinidad and Tobago, came up with the concept, and it was developed by a team that included Israeli artist Doron Gazit and Arieh Dranger, for the 1996 Summer Olympics. Minshall originally called his invention the "Tall Boy". Gazit eventually patented the concept of an inflatable, dancing human-shaped balloon, and licensed the patent to various companies that manufacture and sell the devices.

A notable reference in pop culture comes from Al Harrington, a recurring character on the sitcom Family Guy, who is owner, president, and CEO of "Al Harrington's Wacky Waving Inflatable Arm-Flailing Tubeman Emporium and Warehouse".

See also
List of inflatable manufactured goods

References

Balloons (entertainment)
Advertising by medium